György Vashegyi (born 13 April 1970 in Budapest) is a Hungarian harpsichordist and conductor. He founded the Purcell Choir in 1990 for a performance of Dido and Aeneas. From November 2017 he was elected president of the Hungarian Academy of Arts (MMA), founded in 1992.

Selected recordings 

 2003: Marc-Antoine Charpentier – Messe à 8 voix et 8 violons et flûtes H.3, Domine salvum fac regem H.283, Motet pour les trépassés H.311, Purcell Choir, Orfeo Orchestra, conducted by György Vashegyi. CD Hungaroton classic
 2004: Marc-Antoine Charpentier – Messe des morts H.10, Salve Regina à trois choeurs H.24, Psaulmus Davidis H.207, Purcell Choir, Orfeo Orchestra, conducted by György Vashegyi. CD Hungaroton classic
 2014: Marc-Antoine Charpentier – Messe pour Mr Mauroy H.10, Domine salvum fac regem H.299, 5 Repons H.126, H.129, H.130, H.131, H.134, Purcell Choir, Orfeo Orchestra, conducted by György Vashegyi. CD Hungaroton classic
 2019: Charles-Hubert Gervais – Hypermnestre, Katherine Watson (Hypermnestre), Mathias Vidal (Lyncée), Thomas Dolié (Danaüs), Philippe-Nicolas Martin (Arcas, ombre de Gélanor, le Nil), Chantal Santon-Jeffery (NaÏade, bergère, Coryphée), Juliette Mars (Isis, matelote), Manuel Munez Camelino (Grand Prêtre, Coryphée), Purcell Choir, Orfeo Orchestra, conducted by Giörgy Vashegyi. 2 CD Glossa. 5 Diapason d'Or
 2022: Charles-Hubert Gervais – Grand motets – Exaudi Deus, O filii et filiae, Judica me Deus, Uquequo Domine, Te Deum, Purcell Choir, Orfeo Orchestra, conducted by György Vashegyi. CD Glossa. 5 Diapason d'Or
 2023: Luigi Cherubini – Les Abencérages, Anaïs Constans, Edgaras Montvidas, Thomas Dolié, Orfeo Orchestra, Purcell Choir, György Vashegyi; 2 CDs, Bru Zane BZ1050

References

Hungarian harpsichordists
Hungarian conductors (music)
1970 births
Musicians from Budapest
Living people